Ma Ju-lung (1 April 1939 in Taipei – 9 June 2019 in Taipei) was a Taiwanese actor.

Biography 
He played the stepfather of Van Fan's character Aga in the film Cape No. 7, a role that won him Best Supporting Actor at the 45th Golden Horse Awards in 2008. Ma's portrayal of Geta, a triad leader in Monga, won the Best Supporting Actor Award at the 2011 Chinese Film Media Awards.

Ma backed the 2010 Taipei mayoral campaign of Eric Chu.

Filmography

References

External links

1939 births
2019 deaths
21st-century Taiwanese male actors
20th-century Taiwanese male actors
Taiwanese male film actors
Male actors from Taipei